Badarah may refer to:

Badarah-ye Olya, a village in Kuhdasht-e Shomali Rural District, Iran
Badarah-ye Sofla, a village in Kuhdasht-e Shomali Rural District, Iran